Coupang is a South Korean e-commerce company based in Seoul, South Korea, and incorporated in Delaware, United States. Founded in 2010 by Bom Kim, the company expanded to become the largest online marketplace in South Korea. Its expansion led the company to the video streaming distribution after the launch of the service Coupang Play. Coupang is often referred to as the "Amazon of South Korea", due its position and corporate size in South Korean online market.

Overview
The first marketplace and largest online retailer in South Korea, Coupang's annual revenue as of 2021 is US$18.4 billion. The company's Rocket Delivery network provides same-day or next-day delivery of more than five million unique items. Coupang claims that 99.6 percent of its orders are delivered within 24 hours. 70% of Korean citizens live within 10 minutes of a Coupang logistic center.

Coupang is headquartered in Seoul, South Korea, in the Songpa-gu District. Coupang also has offices in Beijing, Shanghai, Los Angeles, Mountain View, and Seattle. It is incorporated in Delaware, United States.

Coupang was founded by Bom Kim in 2010. A student of Harvard University, Kim started to study for his MBA at Harvard Business School but dropped out six months into the program.

Kim registered Coupang as a limited liability company in the US, allowing to access US funding. In November 2018, Coupang received a US$2 billion investment from SoftBank. Other major investors in Coupang include BlackRock and Fidelity.

The company has grown during the COVID-19 pandemic with increased demand for online shopping. In July 2020, Coupang acquired the assets of Singaporean streaming service HOOQ to form the nucleus of its streaming service named Coupang Play.

Coupang had its IPO on the New York Stock Exchange on 11 March 2021.

On 4 June 2021, Coupang announced that it had started operations in Japan. On 8 July 2021, the company launched in Taiwan.

Financials 
Coupang has grown rapidly. The company announced in 2020 that its annual revenue in 2019 increased by 64.2 percent over the previous year, and totaled 7.15 trillion won ($5.9 billion). Its operating loss in 2019 dropped from 1.13 trillion won to 720.5 billion won, declining 36 percent. The gains were attributed to expanded fast delivery service across the nation, including the overnight Rocket Delivery; sales of home appliances and fresh food; and a steady increase in customers. The company had created 2,500 jobs in 2014 and 30,000 in 2019; labor costs increased correspondingly from 100 billion won in 2014 to 1.4 trillion won in 2019. In 2020, the COVID pandemic  accelerated the company's sales.

According to SoftBank, Coupang's estimated value is $9 billion, and it has earned $3.4 billion venture funding to date. SoftBank funded the company with $2 billion in 2018 and $1 billion in 2015.

Following Coupang's IPO in March 2021, SoftBank owns one-third of the company, Greenoaks Capital has a 16.6% stake, Maverick Holdings 6.4%, and Rose Park Advisors 5.1%. BlackRock holds a 2.1% stake and CEO Bom Suk Kim owns approximately 10.2%.

Its sales increased 74% in the first quarter of 2021 with $4.26 billion recorded, compared to the first quarter of 2020. Its year-over-year net loss increased 180% to $295 million during that same period.

Services

Rocket Delivery 
Coupang is well known for its fast and efficient delivery system. Rocket Delivery is a signature service whereby items ordered before midnight will be delivered overnight by Coupang's own delivery personnel. In July 2020, Coupang's Rocket Delivery staff was renamed from Coupangman to Coupangfriend (쿠팡친구), since the number of female delivery workers has increased, and to imply friendly service.

Rocket Delivery service is free for the Coupang Rocket membership subscribers, for whom delivery is free for all Rocket Delivery tagged products. Rocket Delivery is offered to non-subscribers if they purchase more than KRW4,990. It is estimated that 32% of Coupang users are subscribed. 99.3% of Coupang Rocket Delivery orders are delivered within one day.

Rocket Delivery service is possible via 200 warehouses that are approximately 20 million sq. ft across the country. Coupang's logistic centers store approximately 5.3 million types of products and they are stored by an efficient storage system called Random Stow Algorithm. About 1.7 million Rocket Delivery products are sent out from the logistic centers on a daily basis.

Rocket Wow 

Rocket Wow, a paid subscription service, similar to Amazon Prime, costs users KRW 2,900 per month. On the 30th of Dec 2021, Coupang adjusted the membership fee to KRW 4,990 per month. The increased subscription service has applied to new subscribers.

The features of Rocket Wow are:

 Free delivery for entire Rocket Delivery tagged products
 Free return within 30 days
 Discounts on Rocket Wow tagged products
 One-day delivery 
 Receiving Rocket Fresh products in the morning
 Use of Coupang Play

Rocket Fresh 
Rocket Fresh is a fresh-food delivery service. Similar to Rocket Delivery, Rocket Fresh delivers fresh foods overnight. Users can receive the food by 7am if they order before midnight. The service covers up to 8,500 kinds of foods. It has saved time on grocery shopping and allowed social distancing to prevent COVID-19.

When Rocket Wow subscribers are ordering Rocket Fresh, they can choose the delivery option of Rocket Fresh Eco, which is an option to deliver the foods inside a reusable fresh eco-bag instead of a paper box. The bag preserves the foods in a fresh condition, and is re-collected in the customer's next delivery.

Rocket Direct Purchasing of foreign goods 
Users can purchase foreign goods through Coupang. Rocket Direct Purchasing allows foreign goods to be delivered within 3 days.

Coupang Eats 
Coupang Eats is a food-delivery service like Uber Eats. Coupang users can order food from restaurants, with delivery by Coupang  which can be tracked in real time. According to the "Delivery Service Trend Report 2021" released by market research company Open Survey, delivery-service app usage was topped by Baemin (88.6%), Yogiyo (68.2%), and Coupang Eats (34.7%). Compared to the previous year, Baemin rose 8.9 percent, Yogiyo fell 0.1 percent and Coupang Eats rose 28.6 percent. Coupang Eats' growth year-on-year was also noticeable in the recognition survey of each app. Baemin increased 2.4 percentage points from 93.4 percent last year to 95.8 percent this year, Yogiyo remained 90 percent, and Coupang Eats jumped 49.1 percentage points from 23.3 percent to 72.4 percent. Baedaltong fell from 62.7 percent to 55.5 percent. Coupang Eats topped the list with 74 percent for satisfaction with delivery apps.

Coupang Flex 
Coupang Flex is an outsourcing service that provides temporary employment to anyone over 18 years old. People can choose the date they wish to work and their main work is delivery. Those who have cars can pick up the packages from Coupang's logistic centers and deliver by themselves. Those who does not have cars assist the Coupangman. Coupang flex users are paid KRW 800 per package during the day and KRW1200 per package during the night. On average, they tend to deliver 50 to 60 packages per day.

Coupang Play 
Coupang Play is a South Korean subscription-based video streaming service launched by Coupang in December 2020. It is based on the former Hooq's assets. After the SNL Korea 2 content, which lampooned Korean president candidates and congressperson, got viral, it has gained popularity with a reasonable subscription fee compared to other OTT services such as Netflix, Wavve and TVING.

Sports broadcasting 
 Football
 South Korean national football team
 K League
 La Liga from 2023/24 season
 Ligue 1
 Belgian First Division A
 Major League Soccer (shared with Apple TV+'s MLS Season Pass)
 Super League Greece
 Other sports
 National Football League
 National Hockey League
 Formula One

Original programming 

Scripted
One Ordinary Day (2021)
Anna (2022)

Unscripted
Saturday Night Live Korea (2021; moved from tvN)

Coupang Pay
Coupang Pay is a digital payments service that enables customers to make easy payments. In mid 2020, the company spun off Coupang Pay as a separate fintech subsidiary. By the end of 2020, Coupang Pay was the second most widely used pay system in Korea, with settlement turnover of KRW 25 trillion.

Controversy

Rocket Delivery 
Coupang's own quick-delivery service, which was introduced in 2014 under the name Rocket Delivery, became a hot topic as it promised delivery within 24 hours for purchases worth more than 9,800 won. The service even delivers on holidays. Thanks to this, Coupang currently leads the Korean e-commerce industry in terms of sales. However, Coupang uses its purchased delivery trucks as private vehicles, not as freight transportation, so the license plates of the delivery trucks are white rather than yellow for freight. In Korea, only licensed trucks can carry goods from third parties. Because Coupang is a retailer, they carry their own goods, much like any other retailer that ships things to customers' homes. In addition, if customers change their minds and return their Rocket Delivery product, they have to pay a 5,000 won deduction for box, packaging, and labor costs, unless the customer is a member of the Rocket Wow club, a subscription service that offers free delivery, returns, and online streaming, among other benefits.

Worker deaths 
Coupang has been involved in complaints by activists and families of workers who allegedly died from overwork. In April 2021 Kwon Young-gook, a lawyer and the co-chairman at the Committee for Coupang Workers' Human Rights and Health, said "Seven Coupang employees and two subcontractors have died of cardiovascular disorders, such as heart attack, for the past year. ... Out of the nine deaths, five are connected to overnight work as they passed away during or after night duty." According to statistics published in the Korea Economic Daily, Coupang had recorded no work-accident deaths since its launch in 2011, as of the end of 2020.

Coupang is not the only logistics and delivery business facing such complaints in 2021. According to the BBC, CJ Logistics and Hanjin Transportation are some of the multiple businesses that have been involved in the controversy, and workers at Lotte Global Logistics in Seoul went on strike. In April 2021, the company introduced Coupang Care, a system that allows employees to take paid breaks and receive health care coaching.

Item Winner system
There is a debate over Coupang's Item Winner system, which selects the cheapest product among the same products as the sole seller. There is criticism that sellers offering items for as low as one won can monopolize the market. According to Coupang's terms and conditions, this right is delegated to Coupang as soon as the product's image and trademark are posted. In the process, problems can arise because sellers can use other sellers' images, via Coupang's copyright-transfer agreements. In May 2021, the situation was reported to be under review by the Fair Trade Commission.

References

External links

 Official Website

South Korean companies established in 2010
Logistics companies of South Korea
Companies based in Seoul
Retail companies established in 2010
Internet properties established in 2010
Online marketplaces of South Korea
South Korean brands
Companies listed on the New York Stock Exchange
2021 initial public offerings